The East Asian Games was a multi-sport event organized by the East Asian Games Association (EAGA) and held every four years from 1993 to 2013. Among those who competed included athletes from East Asian countries and territories of the Olympic Council of Asia (OCA), as well as the Pacific island nation of Guam, which is a member of the Oceania National Olympic Committees.

The East Asian Games was one of five subregional Games of the Olympic Council of Asia (OCA). The others are the Central Asian Games, the South Asian Games, the Southeast Asian Games (or SEA Games), and the West Asian Games.

It ended after the 2013 tournament. Instead, the East Asian Youth Games had a plan to start in Taichung, Taiwan in 2019 but failed. The Olympic Council of Asia (OCA) plans to revive the East Asian Games, after the cancellation of the 2019 East Asian Youth Games due to the 2018 Taiwanese referendum, where one of the questions inquired whether Taiwan should participate in Olympics using the name, "Taiwan", instead of Chinese Taipei. The vote was eventually vetoed by the Taiwanese voters, but the game was officially cancelled regardless due to the Chinese government exerting political pressures over the Olympic Council.

Participating nations
All 8 countries whose National Olympic Committee is recognized by the East Asian Games Association and 1 country  whose National Olympic Committee is recognized by the Oceania National Olympic Committees.

Kazakhstan is a former member of the EAGA. It now participates in the Central Asian Games.

List of East Asian Games

Medal count
Of the 10 National Olympic Committees participating throughout the history of the Games, all nations have won at least a single medal in the competition. 9 nations have won at least a single gold medal.

1Former member

Sports
30 sports were competed in East Asian Games history, including the 2013 edition in Tianjin.

 Aquatics
 
 
 
 
 
 
 
 
 
 
 
 
 
 
 
 
 
 
 
 
 
 
 
 
 
 
Tennis
 
 
Volleyball

See also 

 Events of the OCA (Continental)
 Asian Games
 Asian Winter Games
 Asian Youth Games
 Asian Beach Games
 Asian Indoor and Martial Arts Games

 Events of the OCA (Subregional)
 Central Asian Games
 East Asian Youth Games
 South Asian Games
 Southeast Asian Games
 West Asian Games

 Events of the APC (Continental)
 Asian Para Games
 Asian Winter Para Games
 Asian Youth Para Games
 Asian Youth Winter Para Games

 Events of the APC (Subregional)
 ASEAN Para Games

References

External links 
 East Asian Games Information
 2009 East Asian Games official website (Link rot)
 2013 East Asian Games official website
 East Asian Games Schedules

 
Recurring sporting events established in 1993
Multi-sport events in Asia
Sport in East Asia
1993 establishments in Asia